Mast is a surname. Notable people with the surname include:

Austin Mast (born 1972), American botanist
 Brian Mast (b. 1980), American Florida congressman
Dennis Mast (born 1992), German footballer
Dick Mast (born 1951), American professional golfer
Emily Mast (born 1976), American artist
Günter Mast, German manager
Katja Mast (born 1971), German politician
Maura Mast, Irish-American mathematician
Peggy Mast (fl. 20th/21st century), American politician
Rick Mast (born 1957), American NASCAR driver
Wilhelm Mast, founder of Mast-Jägermeister

Mast is also a given name, and may refer to:
 Mast Ali, Indian actor